Lady Ottoline Violet Anne Morrell (16 June 1873 – 21 April 1938) was an English aristocrat and society hostess. Her patronage was influential in artistic and intellectual circles, where she befriended writers including Aldous Huxley, Siegfried Sassoon, T. S. Eliot and D. H. Lawrence, and artists including Mark Gertler, Dora Carrington and Gilbert Spencer.

Early life 
Born Ottoline Violet Anne Cavendish-Bentinck, she was the daughter of Lieutenant-General Arthur Cavendish-Bentinck (son of Lord and Lady Charles Bentinck) and his second wife, the former Augusta Browne, later created Baroness Bolsover. Lady Ottoline's great-great-uncle (through her paternal grandmother, Lady Charles Bentinck) was Field Marshal The 1st Duke of Wellington.  Through her father, Arthur, she was a first cousin once removed of Queen Elizabeth the Queen Mother, and thus a first cousin twice removed of Queen Elizabeth II, both of whom descended from Arthur's brother Rev. Charles William Frederick Cavendish-Bentinck.

Ottoline was granted the rank of a daughter of a duke with the courtesy title of "Lady" when her half-brother William succeeded to the Dukedom of Portland in 1879, at which time the family moved into Welbeck Abbey in Nottinghamshire. The dukedom was a title which belonged to the Cavendish-Bentinck family and which passed to Lady Ottoline's branch upon the death of their cousin, the 5th Duke of Portland, in December 1879.

In 1899, Ottoline began studying political economy and Roman history as an out-student at Somerville College, Oxford.

Notable love affairs 
Morrell was known to have had many lovers. Her first love affair was with an older man, the physician and writer Axel Munthe, but she rejected his impulsive proposal of marriage because her spiritual beliefs were incompatible with his atheism. In February 1902, she married the MP Philip Morrell, with whom she shared a passion for art and a strong interest in Liberal politics. They had what would now be known as an open marriage for the rest of their lives.

Philip's extramarital affairs produced several children who were cared for by his wife, who also struggled to conceal evidence of his mental instability. The Morrells themselves had two children (twins): a son, Hugh, who died in infancy; and a daughter, Julian, whose first marriage was to Victor Goodman and second marriage was to Igor Vinogradoff.

Morrell had a long affair with philosopher Bertrand Russell, with whom she exchanged more than 3,500 letters. Her lovers may have included the painters Augustus John and Henry Lamb, the artist Dora Carrington, and the art historian Roger Fry. 

In her later years she had a brief affair with a gardener, Lionel Gomme, who was employed at Garsington. According to some literary critics, the fling of Morrell with "Tiger", a young stonemason who came to carve plinths for her garden statues, influenced the story in D. H. Lawrence's novel Lady Chatterley's Lover.

Her circle of friends included many authors, artists, sculptors and poets. Her work as a patron was enduring and influential, notably in her contribution to the Contemporary Art Society during its early years.

Hospitality

The Morrells maintained a townhouse in Bedford Square in Bloomsbury and also owned a country house at Peppard, near Henley on Thames. Selling the house at Peppard in 1911, they subsequently bought and restored Garsington Manor near Oxford. Morrell delighted in opening both as havens for like-minded people. 44 Bedford Square served as her London salon, while Garsington provided a convenient retreat, near enough to London for many of their friends to join them for weekends. She took a keen interest in the work of young contemporary artists, such as Stanley Spencer, and she was particularly close to Mark Gertler and Dora Carrington, who were regular visitors to Garsington during the war. Gilbert Spencer lived for a while in a house on the Garsington estate.

During World War I, the Morrells were pacifists. They invited conscientious objectors such as Duncan Grant, Clive Bell and Lytton Strachey to take refuge at Garsington. Siegfried Sassoon, recuperating there after an injury, was encouraged to go absent without leave as a protest against the war.

The hospitality offered by the Morrells was such that most of their guests had no suspicion that they were in financial difficulties. Many of them assumed that Ottoline was a wealthy woman. This was far from being the case and during 1927, the Morrells were compelled to sell the manor house and its estate, and move to more modest quarters in Gower Street, London.   In 1928 she was diagnosed with cancer, which resulted in a long hospitalisation and the removal of her lower teeth and part of her jaw.

Later life 

Later, Lady Ottoline remained a regular host to the adherents of the Bloomsbury Group, in particular Virginia Woolf, and to many other artists and authors, who included W. B. Yeats, L. P. Hartley, and T. S. Eliot, and maintained an enduring friendship with Welsh painter Augustus John. She was an influential patron to many of them, and a valued friend, who nevertheless attracted understandable mockery, due to her combination of eccentric attire with an aristocratic manner, extreme shyness and a deep religious faith that set her apart from her times.

Her work as a decorator, colourist, and garden designer remains undervalued, but it was for her great gift for friendship that she was mourned when she died in April 1938. She died from an experimental drug given by a doctor.

The novelist Henry Green wrote to Philip Morrell of "her love for all things true and beautiful which she had more than anyone ... no one can ever know the immeasurable good she did".

Monuments carved by Eric Gill are in St Winifred's Church, Holbeck and St Mary's Church, Garsington.
A blue plaque in her honour was erected at her London home, 10 Gower Street, by the Greater London Council, in 1986.

Literary legacy

Morrell wrote two volumes of memoirs, but these were edited and revised after her death. She also maintained detailed journals, over a period of twenty years, which remain unpublished. But perhaps Lady Ottoline's most interesting literary legacy is the wealth of representations of her that appear in 20th-century literature.

She was the inspiration for Mrs Bidlake in Aldous Huxley's Point Counter Point, for Hermione Roddice in D. H. Lawrence's Women in Love, for Lady Caroline Bury in Graham Greene's It's a Battlefield, and for Lady Sybilline Quarrell in Alan Bennett's Forty Years On. The Coming Back (1933), another novel which portrays her, was written by Constance Malleson, one of Ottoline's many rivals for the affection of Bertrand Russell, as was Pugs and Peacocks (1921) by Gabriel Cannan. Some critics consider her the inspiration for Lawrence's Lady Chatterley.

Huxley's roman à clef Crome Yellow depicts the life at a thinly-veiled Garsington, with a caricature of Lady Ottoline Morrell for which she never forgave him. In Confidence, a short story by Katherine Mansfield, portrays the "wits of Garsington" some four years in advance of Crome Yellow, and with more wit than Huxley, according to Mansfield's biographer Antony Alpers. Published in The New Age of 24 May 1917, it was not reprinted until 1984 in Alpers' collection of her short stories. Five young gentlemen are having a drawing-room argument, observed by Isobel and Marigold: Aren't men extraordinary says Marigold.

Portrayals in the arts
Non-literary portraits are also part of this interesting legacy, as seen in the artistic photographs of her by Cecil Beaton. There are portraits by Henry Lamb, Duncan Grant, Augustus John, and others.

She is portrayed by Tilda Swinton in Derek Jarman's film Wittgenstein, by Roberta Taylor in Brian Gilbert's film  Tom & Viv, by Penelope Wilton in Christopher Hampton's film Carrington and by Suzanne Bertish in Terence Davies' film Benediction.

The first production of a biographical play, Ottoline by Janet Bolam, took place in the gardens of Garsington Manor in July 2021.

Photography
Morrell took hundreds of photographs of the people in her circle. Carolyn Heilbrun edited Lady Ottoline's Album (1976), a collection of snapshots and photographic portraits of Morrell and of her famous contemporaries, mostly taken by Morrell herself.

See also
 Headington Hill Hall, Oxford
 Joseph Conrad (Lady Ottoline's impression)

References

Further reading

External links

 Photographs of Ottoline Morrell at the National Portrait Gallery
 
 Ottoline Morrell's Collection at the Harry Ransom Center at The University of Texas at Austin
 Journal of Lady Ottoline Morrell, June 1926, with photographs of Virginia Woolf and TS Eliot via Discovering Literature at the British Library
 Journal of Lady Ottoline Morrell, June 1923, with photographs and accounts of Virginia Woolf via Discovering Literature at the British Library
 Journal of Lady Ottoline Morrell, 1917, with accounts of Virginia Woolf and Siegfried Sassoon via Discovering Literature at the British Library
 Pictures by Lady Ottoline Morrell
 Lady Ottoline Morrell papers, at the University of Maryland Libraries

1873 births
1938 deaths
Bloomsbury Group
English socialites
Ottoline
Alumni of Somerville College, Oxford
Daughters of barons